Glenadrienne is a suburb of Johannesburg, South Africa. It is located in Region 3. This wealthy residential neighborhood lies south of Lyme Park, southwest of Littlefillan, north of Riepen Park and east of Randburg.

References

Johannesburg Region B